The 15th World Cup season began in December 1980 in France and concluded in March 1981 in Switzerland.  Phil Mahre became the first American to win an overall title, the first of his three consecutive overall titles.
Marie-Theres Nadig of Switzerland won the women's overall title.

Six-time ladies overall champion Annemarie Moser-Pröll of Austria, who first competed on the World Cup tour in 1969 at age 16, and four-time men's overall champion Gustav Thöni of Italy, who first competed on the World Cup tour in 1970 at age 18, both retired at the end of the 1980 season. After winning the overall title this year, Nadig, who had joined the tour in 1971, also retired.  In part to stop this exodus of talent, the International Ski Federation decided to offer a new kind of license to its athletes, called a "B license", which permitted holders to receive sponsorship payments directly (instead of through their federation) but still retain their World Cup eligibility.

Calendar

Men

Ladies

Men

Overall 

see complete table

In Men's Overall World Cup 1980/81 the best five downhills, best five giant slaloms, best five slaloms and best three combined count. 28 racers had a point deduction. Ingemar Stenmark had 156 points deduction and won 10 races. For the first time he tried to score points in combined and was able to collect 15 points - not enough to win the Overall World Cup.

Downhill 

see complete table

In Men's Downhill World Cup 1980/81 the best 5 results count. Six racers had a point deduction, which are given in brackets.

Giant Slalom 

see complete table

In Men's Giant Slalom World Cup 1980/81 the best 5 results count. 15 racers had a point deduction, which are given in brackets. Ingemar Stenmark won the cup with maximum points. He won his sixth Giant Slalom World Cup! This record is still unbeaten!

Slalom 

see complete table

In Men's Slalom World Cup 1980/81 the best 5 results count. 13 racers had a point deduction, which are given in brackets. Ingemar Stenmark won his seventh Slalom World Cup in a row! This record is still unbeaten!

Combined 

see complete table

In Men's Combined World Cup 1980/81 all 5 results count.

Ladies

Overall 

see complete table

In Women's Overall World Cup 1980/81 the best five downhills, best five giant slaloms, best five slaloms and best three combined count. 19 racers had a point deduction. Marie-Theres Nadig won 9 races.

Downhill 

see complete table

In Women's Downhill World Cup 1980/81 the best 5 results count. Ten racers had a point deduction, which are given in brackets.

Giant Slalom 

see complete table

In Women's Giant Slalom World Cup 1980/81 the best 5 results count. 12 racers had a point deduction, which are given in brackets.

Slalom 

see complete table

In Women's Slalom World Cup 1980/81 the best 5 results count. Five racers had a point deduction, which are given in brackets. Erika Hess won six races in a row. She won the World Cup with maximum points.

Combined 

see complete table

In Women's Combined World Cup 1980/81 all 5 results count.

Nations Cup

Overall

Men

Ladies

References

External links
FIS-ski.com - World Cup standings - 1981
FIS Alpine Skiing World Cup at SVT's open archive (including the 1980-1981 season) 

FIS Alpine Ski World Cup
World Cup
World Cup